Club Deportivo Toledo, S.A.D. "B" is the reserve team of CD Toledo, a Spanish football team based in Toledo, in the autonomous community of Castile-La Mancha.

Home kits consist of green shirts and white shorts.

Season to season

External links
Official website 
Futbolme team profile 
Unofficial fansite 

Football clubs in Castilla–La Mancha
Association football clubs established in 2007
Sport in Toledo, Spain
 
2007 establishments in Spain
Spanish reserve football teams